Diklići is a village in the municipality of Trebinje, Republika Srpska, Bosnia and Herzegovina and partially in the municipality of Ravno, Bosnia and Herzegovina.

History
During World War II Partisan forces attacked a German train between the railway stations of Diklići and Gojšina, killing 2 German soldiers and 1 Domobran.

During the Yugoslav Wars, the village was attacked and burnt down by Croat forces.

Demographics 
According to the 1991 census, it was inhabited by 13 people, all ethnic Serbs.

According to the 2013 census, its population was just 1, a Serb living in the Trebinje part.

References

Sources

Villages in Bosnia and Herzegovina
Populated places in Trebinje
Populated places in Ravno, Bosnia and Herzegovina
Former villages